Motsholetsi Sikele (born 1 December 1991) is a Motswana footballer playing for Township Rollers in the Botswana Premier League. He is a full Botswana international, having made his debut on 9 September 2018.

Honours

Clubs
 Township Rollers
Botswana Premier League:5
2013-14, 2015-16, 2016-17, 2017-18, 2018-19
Mascom Top 8 Cup:1
2017-18

References

Living people
1991 births
Botswana footballers
Botswana international footballers
Township Rollers F.C. players
Gilport Lions F.C. players
Association football wingers